John Saxe may refer to:

 John Godfrey Saxe (1816–1887), American poet
 John Godfrey Saxe II (1877–1953), lawyer and member of the New York State Senate
 John Theodore Saxe (1843–1881), member of the firm of Saxe Brothers and professor at the Albany Academy

See also
John Saxon (disambiguation)